Jonathan Newsome (born January 22, 1991) is an American football defensive end for the Birmingham Stallions of the United States Football League (USFL). He played college football at Ohio State and Ball State, and was drafted by the Indianapolis Colts in the fifth round of the 2014 NFL Draft. He has also been a member of the Saskatchewan Roughriders and Ottawa Redblacks (CFL).

High school
As a senior Newsome was named All-Ohio Second-team while playing for Coach Ted Ginn Sr. at Glenville High School in Cleveland. He totaled 101 tackles and 17 sacks as a senior.

College career

2009 & 2010 seasons
Newsome started his college career at Ohio State. In 2009, he played in five games for the Buckeyes. In 2010, he earned his first collegiate start vs. Minnesota and played in all 13 of the Buckeyes games.

2012 & 2013 seasons
After his transfer to Ball State Newsome redshirted the 2011 season. He started 22 games in 2 seasons for the Cardinals, racking up 116 tackles (24 of them for a loss in yards), and 16.5 sacks for a total loss of 96 yards.

College awards
 2013 All-Mid-American Conference First-team
 2013 Rotary Lombardi Award Preseason Watch List
 2013 Ted Hendricks Award Preseason Watch List
 2013 Mid-American Conference West Division
 2012 All-Mid-American Conference Second-team

Professional career

Indianapolis Colts
Newsome was selected in the fifth round (164th overall) of the 2014 NFL draft by the Indianapolis Colts, the first Ball State player to be drafted by the Colts. He recorded his first NFL tackle on the September 21, 2014 in the Colts win over the Jacksonville Jaguars. In week 9, playing against the New York Giants, he recorded 7 tackles, 2 sacks, and 1 forced fumble. Newsome made his first career start in week 17, and went on to win the AFC Defensive Player of the Week award for his performance. He finished the game with 8 tackles, 1 forced fumble, and 2 sacks. Newsome finished the season with a team-leading 6.5 total sacks, the second-most amongst NFL rookies in 2014 and the third most by a rookie in Colts' franchise history. Jonathan was released from the Indianapolis Colts on February 22, 2016, after being arrested by police for marijuana possession.

Saskatchewan Roughriders
On May 30, 2016, Newsome signed with the Saskatchewan Roughriders of the Canadian Football League (CFL). He played in all 18 regular season games in the 2016 season, contributing 27 defensive tackles, six special teams tackles and two quarterback sacks. In game 2 of the 2017 season, on July 1, 2017, Newsome recorded an interception in the Roughriders' 43–40 loss to Winnipeg. The Riders released Newsome three days later on July 4, 2017.

Ottawa Redblacks 
Three days after being released by the Riders, Newsome signed with the Ottawa Redblacks (CFL). In his first game, Newsome recorded three tackles and sealed the win for the Redblacks with an interception. In nine games with Ottawa, Newsome recorded 13 tackles, four sacks, an interception, and a forced fumble. The following year, Newsome missed time with injury, but still had eight tackles and a sack in eight games played for 2018; a season where Ottawa played in the 106th Grey Cup. On December 20, 2018, Newsome signed a one-year extension with Ottawa; in the 2018 postseason and in 2019 training camp the team experimented with a designated package of plays for Newsome, moving him around the field to a variety of linebacker positions. After playing in six games for Ottawa and recording one defensive tackle and three special teams tackles, Newsome was released.

BC Lions 
On August 20, 2019, Newsome was signed by the BC Lions to a practice roster agreement. That week he was activated to the active roster. On September 13, 2019, he recorded two defensive tackles and had a key sack on third and goal against the Ottawa REDBLACKS, his former team. In eight games with the Lions, Newsome recorded 14 defensive tackles, a special teams tackle, four sacks and a forced fumble.

Newsome announced his retirement from professional football in March 2021 through his Instagram account.

Birmingham Stallions
Newsome later came out of retirement and was selected in the 4th round of the 2022 USFL Draft by the Birmingham Stallions.

NFL career statistics

References

External links

1991 births
Living people
Players of Canadian football from Cleveland
Players of American football from Cleveland
American football linebackers
Glenville High School alumni
African-American players of American football
Ohio State Buckeyes football players
Ball State Cardinals football players
Indianapolis Colts players
African-American players of Canadian football
Canadian football linebackers
Saskatchewan Roughriders players
Ottawa Redblacks players
BC Lions players
21st-century African-American sportspeople
Birmingham Stallions (2022) players